Reinhold Bachler (born 26 December 1944) is an Austrian former ski jumper. He was born in Eisenerz, and competed from 1968 to 1978.

Career
His best-known finish was a silver medal in the Individual Normal Hill at the 1968 Winter Olympics in Grenoble. He later worked as a coach from 1982 to 2000.

On 12 March 1967, he set the ski jumping world record distance at 154 metres (505 ft) on Vikersundbakken hill in Vikersund, Norway.

On 20 March 1977, as trial jumper set his personal best and hill record at the same time, which lasted for two years at 172 metres (564 ft) on Velikanka bratov Gorišek K165 in Planica, Yugoslavia.

Ski jumping world record

References

External links
 
 

1944 births
Living people
Austrian male ski jumpers
Olympic silver medalists for Austria
Olympic ski jumpers of Austria
Ski jumpers at the 1968 Winter Olympics
Ski jumpers at the 1972 Winter Olympics
Ski jumpers at the 1976 Winter Olympics
Austrian ski jumping coaches
Olympic medalists in ski jumping
Medalists at the 1968 Winter Olympics
People from Leoben District
Sportspeople from Styria
20th-century Austrian people